ICSC can refer to:

 International Cataloguing Standards Committee, in thoroughbred horse racing
 International Chemical Safety Cards, promoting the safe use of chemicals in the workplace
 International Civil Service Commission, administering the United Nations common system
 International Climate Science Coalition, a climate change denialist group
 International Council of Shopping Centers, the global trade association for shopping centers
 Islamia College of Science and Commerce, Srinagar, located in Jammu and Kashmir state, India
 International Committee of Silent Chess, renamed International Chess Committee of the Deaf (ICCD) in 2012